Photinia berberidifolia is a species in the family Rosaceae, which includes roses and many kinds of fruit-bearing trees.

References

berberidifolia